Planktonic Finales is an album by a collective trio consisting of bassist Stephan Crump, saxophonist Ingrid Laubrock and pianist Cory Smythe. It was recorded in 2015 and released by Intakt Records.

Reception

The Down Beat review by Carlo Wolff states, "The sonics are interesting in a workshop way, but few of the 11 tunes are memorable for much more than process. While that can be intellectually stimulating, one eventually craves a melodic statement rather than a musical 'trialogue'."

Track listing
All music by Stephan Crump, Ingrid Laubrock, Cory Smythe
 "With Eyes Peeled" – 5:49
 "Tones for Climbing Plants" – 7:04 
 "Sinew Modulations" – 11:46
 "Through the Forest" – 3:56
 "A House Alone" – 2:42
 "Three-Panel" – 6:11
 "Submerged (Personal) Effects" – 3:40
 "Pulse Memory" – 2:26
 "Bite Bright Sunlight" – 1:51
 "As if in its Throat" – 4:07
 "Inscribed in Trees" – 3:45

Personnel
Stephan Crump – acoustic bass
Ingrid Laubrock – tenor sax, soprano sax
Cory Smythe – piano

References

 

2017 albums
Ingrid Laubrock albums
Intakt Records albums